Bichelsee is a lake in the canton of Thurgau, Switzerland. The village of Bichelsee in the municipality Bichelsee-Balterswil is named after the lake. Of the surface of 0.092 km², 5/6 are located in the canton of Thurgau, the remainder in the canton of Zurich.

Lakes of Thurgau
Lakes of the canton of Zürich
Lakes of Switzerland